Catherine Bennett may refer to:
Catherine Bennett (actress) (1901–1978) Australian actress  
Catherine Bennett (baseball) (born 1920), Canadian pitcher in the All-American Girls Professional Baseball League
Catherine Bennett (journalist) (born 1956), British journalist

See also
Katherine Bennett (disambiguation)
Bennett (name)